Municipal elections were held in Belize on 4 March 2015. Voters elected 67 representatives, 18 on city councils and 49 on town councils. The elections were a decisive victory for the ruling United Democratic Party, which won 62 out of the 67 seats nationwide. The opposition People's United Party won the remaining seats, losing control of town councils in Dangriga and Punta Gorda, maintaining a majority only in Orange Walk Town.

Participating parties 
 United Democratic Party
 People's United Party
 Vision Inspired by the People (Belmopan and San Pedro Town only)
 People's National Party (Punta Gorda only)

Results

Belize City
Belize City Mayor Darrell Bradley was re-elected to a second term on the UDP ticket with 63 percent of the vote, defeating PUP nominee Yolanda Schakron and independent candidate Eustaquio "Ernesto" Torres. The UDP also swept all 10 seats on the Belize City Council.

Belmopan
In Belmopan, UDP mayoral candidate Khalid Belisle defeated the PUP's Jose Amilcar Chacon and the VIP's Hubert Dennis Enriquez. The UDP also won all six city council seats.

Towns
Benque Viejo del Carmen: Heraldo "Rancha" Ramcharan Jr. (UDP) elected mayor; UDP wins town council 6–0.
Corozal Town: Hilberto Campos (UDP) elected mayor; UDP wins town council 6–0.
Dangriga: Francis Humphreys (UDP) elected mayor; UDP wins town council 6–0.
Orange Walk Town: Kevin Bernard (PUP) elected mayor; PUP wins town council 4–2.
Punta Gorda: Fern Gutierrez (UDP) elected mayor; UDP wins town council 6–0.
San Ignacio/Santa Elena: Earl Trapp (UDP) elected mayor; UDP wins town council 6–0.
San Pedro Town: Daniel Guerrero (UDP) elected mayor; UDP wins town council 6–0.

References

2015 elections in Central America
2015 elections in the Caribbean
Municipal elections
2015